The Commandant of Cadets is a named organization of the United States Air Force based at the Air Force Academy in Colorado Springs, Colorado. Until August 2006 The commander of the 34th Training Wing was "dual-hatted" as the Commandant of Cadets at the Academy.  In that month the 34th Wing was became a named organization.

The organization was first activated in 1941 as the 34th Bombardment Group.  Following the attack on Pearl Harbor, the group briefly participated in antisubmarine patrols.  During most of 1942 and 1943, the group acted as a heavy bomber training unit.  In early 1944, the unit began preparations to move overseas.  It served with Eighth Air Force in England, from April 1944 until the end of the war, converting form the Consolidated B-24 Liberator to the Boeing B-17 Flying Fortress in the middle of combat operations. It returned to the United States after VE Day and was inactivated in August 1945.

The 34th Tactical Group was activated in the early days of American participation in the Vietnam War.  It trained Republic of Vietnam Air Force airmen and engaged in combat operations and the operational testing of weapons and munitions until 1965, when the increasing American involvement in Vietnam caused it to be replaced by the larger 6251st Tactical Fighter Wing.

In 1984 the 34th Bombardment Group and the 34th Tactical Group were consolidated into a single unit.  The consolidated unit was redesignated the 34th Training Wing  and activated in October 1994 at the United States Air Force Academy, where it has served the Commandant of Cadets as the military training arm of the academy.

Mission
The mission of the Commandant of Cadets is to educate and train potential United States Air Force officers as the administrative organization responsible for cadet leadership and military training programs, instruction in military and airmanship courses, and general supervision of cadet life activities.

History

World War II

The group was first activated at Langley Field, Virginia in January 1941 as the 34th Bombardment Group and equipped with a mixture of B-17C and B-17D Flying Fortresses and Douglas B-18 Bolos. Its original squadrons were the 4th, 7th, and 18th Bombardment Squadrons, while the 1st Reconnaissance Squadron)
was initially assigned to General Headquarters Air Force, but attached to the 34th Bombardment Group. The 34th Group moved to Westover Field, Massachusetts four months after it was activated.

After the Pearl Harbor attack the group began antisubmarine patrols off the Northeast coast of the United States, but soon became part of Western Defense Command and moved to Pendleton Field, Oregon.  By the summer of 1942, Second Air Force had become primarily a heavy bomber training force and the group became a B-17 Replacement Training Unit (RTU) at Geiger Field. RTUs were oversized units which trained aircrews prior to their deployment to combat theaters.

On 15 December 1942 the group moved to Blythe Army Air Base, California a base of the Desert Training Center. The 34th provided cadres for a number of heavy bomber groups that served with Eighth Air Force during this period.

The 34th began training with Consolidated B-24 Liberators for overseas combat operations on 5 January 1944. The ground echelon moved to the port of embarkation on 1 April 1944, while the air echelon began its overseas movement on 31 May 1944, taking the southern ferry route, from Florida to Trinidad, Brazil, West Africa and Marrakesh, arriving at RAF Valley, Wales. The group arrived at its permanent station, RAF Mendlesham, England, in April 1944 and entered combat on 23 May 1944.

The 34th flew 170 operations from Mendlesham, the first sixty-two while flying B-24H and B-24J Liberators and the remainder with B-17G Flying Fortresses. The group helped to prepare for Operation Overlord, the invasion of Normandy, by bombing airfields in France and Germany, and supported the June landings by attacking coastal defenses and communications. It supported ground forces at Saint-Lô in late July and struck V-1 flying bomb launch sites, gun emplacements, and supply lines throughout the summer of 1944.

The mixture of B-24s and B-17s in the 3d Bombardment Division presented a number of operational problems, and in early 1944 plans had begun at VIII Bomber Command headquarters to standardize the division with the Flying Fortress. The group flew its last B-24 mission on 24 August 1944. It transferred its Liberators for overhaul and eventual transfer to units of the 2d Bombardment Division, and began converting to B-17s and flew its first mission with the new planes on 17 September 1944. The 34th engaged primarily in bombardment of strategic objectives from October 1944 to February 1945. Targets included marshalling yards in Ludwigshafen, Hamm, Osnabrück, and Darmstadt; oil centers in Bielefeld, Merseburg, Hamburg, and Misburg; factories in Berlin, Dalteln, and Hanover; and airfields in Münster, Neumünster, and Frankfurt.

During this period the group also supported ground forces during the Battle of the Bulge from December 1944 to January 1945. In March 1945, with few enemy industrial targets remaining and with Allied armies advancing across Germany, the 34th turned almost solely to interdicting enemy communications and supporting Allied ground forces. As training programs in the States accelerated, replacement crews arriving later in the war tended to be younger than those arriving earlier.  One 34th crew, that of 2d Lt Joe Novick, was claimed to be the youngest in VIII Bomber Command.  Lt Novicki was the "old man" at 21 and all other crew members were 19 or 20 years old in 1945. The 34th flew its last combat mission on 20 April 1945.

After V-E Day the group flew six missions carrying food to flooded areas of the Netherlands and transported prisoners of war from German camps to Allied centers. The group redeployed to the United States in June and July 1945. The first elements of the air echelon departed 19 June 1945. Upon arrival in the states, group personnel were given 30 days leave. The group reassembled at Sioux Falls Army Air Field, South Dakota, where it was inactivated on 28 August 1945.

Vietnam War

The 34th Tactical Group was activated in July 1963 to train Republic of Vietnam Air Force (VNAF) personnel in counter-insurgency operations. It trained VNAF strike pilots, forward air controllers, and observers.  Its initial squadrons were the 1st Air Commando Squadron, a composite unit flying Douglas B-26 Invaders at first, and the 19th Tactical Air Support Squadron, equipped with Cessna O-1 Bird Dogs. Later, the 1st also operated Helio U-10 Couriers, North American T-28 Trojans and Douglas C-47 Skytrains. The Air Force intended to turn the 19th's Bird Dogs over to the VNAF, and the squadron was inactivated in August 1964.  However, the Gulf of Tonkin incident altered these plans and the squadron was activated again in October. The squadron's forward air controllers became more critical as the war expanded into populated areas and it became necessary to minimize civilian casualties.

Plans had also been made to withdraw the 1st Air Commando Squadron and transfer its aircraft to the VNAF after replacing its AT-28s and B-26s with A-1Hs, but these plans were cancelled. Due to age and hard use in combat, two AT-28s lost their wings and crashed in March and April 1964, while in June all B-26s were grounded. The 1st only remained operational by borrowing nine T-28Bs from the VNAF. These incidents confirmed the plan to convert the squadron's attack aircraft to the Douglas A-1 Skyraider

The 34th also flew combat missions, including close air support, fighter escort and interdiction, psychological warfare, aerial supply, forward air control and tactical liaison. It pioneered tactical weapons and munitions, such as the minigun, the daisycutter, and the gunship. In the fall of 1964, the 602d Fighter Squadron (Commando) was activated and assigned to the group. The Skyraider became the primary strike aircraft of the 1st and 602d Squadrons from this time.

The group controlled its first jet aircraft in 1964 when Martin B-57 Canberras of the 8th and 13th Bombardment Squadrons, stationed at Clark Air Base in the Philippines began to rotate to Bien Hoa, where they were attached to the group for operations. These were the first USAF jets in Viet Nam.  Prior to the passage of the Gulf of Tonkin Resolution, the United States had interpreted the Geneva Accords as prohibiting jet combat aircraft from former French Indochina. On the night of 1 November, Viet Cong located just outside the perimeter of Bien Hoa attacked the base with mortars, destroying five B-57s and damaging an additional 15.

Aircrews of the 1st Air Commando Squadron performed the first combat tests of the FC-47 (later Douglas AC-47 Spooky) gunship beginning in December 1964. As more Air Force units moved to Bien Hoa, the 6251st Tactical Fighter Wing replaced the group in July 1965, and the 34th was inactivated.

Cadet training

In September 1985, the 34th Bombardment Group and the 34th Tactical Group were consolidated into a single unit.  In late 1994, the consolidated unit was redesignated the 34th Training Wing and activated with two assigned groups as the administrative organization responsible for cadet leadership and military training programs under the supervision of the Commandant of Cadets at the United States Air Force Academy. It is responsible for instruction in military and general supervision of cadet life activities.  Until October 2004 it also provided airmanship courses. Its 34th Operations Group was inactivated in 2004 and its airmanship training mission became the responsibility of the 306th Flying Training Group of Air Education and Training Command.  In 2006, it reorganized and its 34th Education Group was inactivated and replaced by four Cadet Groups.

Lineage
 34th Bombardment Group
 Established as the 34th Bombardment Group (Heavy) on 20 November 1940
 Activated on 15 January 1941
 Redesignated 34th Bombardment Group, c. 15 February 1944
 Inactivated on 28 August 1945
 Consolidated with the 34th Tactical Group as the 34th Tactical Group on 31 January 1984

 34th Training Wing
 Established as the 34th Tactical Group and activated, on 19 June 1963 (not organized)
 Organized on 8 July 1963
 Discontinued and inactivated on 8 July 1965
 Consolidated with the 34th Bombardment Group on 31 January 1984

 Consolidated unit
 Redesignated 34th Training Wing on 30 September 1994
 Activated on 31 October 1994
 Redesignated Commandant of Cadets on 30 August 2006

Assignments

 2d Bombardment Wing, 15 January 1941
 4th Bombardment Wing, 3 June 1941
 I Bomber Command, 5 September 1941
 2d (later, Second) Air Force, 27 January 1942
 16th Bombardment Training Wing (later, 16 Bombardment Operational Training Wing), c. 15 December 1942
 93d Combat Bombardment Wing, c. 26 April 1944

 45th Combat Bombardment Wing, 24 May 1945
 20th Bombardment Wing, 18 June – 28 August 1945
 Pacific Air Forces, 19 June 1963 (not organized)
 2d Air Division, 8 July 1963 – 8 July 1965
 United States Air Force Academy, 31 October 1994 – present

Components
Groups
 34th Operations Group: 31 October 1994 – 4 October 2004
 34th Education Group: 7 November 1994 – 1 August 2006
 1st Cadet Group: 1 August 2006 – present
 2d Cadet Group: 1 August 2006 – present
 3d Cadet Group: 1 August 2006 – present
 4th Cadet Group: 1 August 2006 – present

Squadrons
 1st Reconnaissance (Squadron later 391st Bombardment Squadron): attached 15 January 1941 – 24 February 1942, assigned 25 February 1942 – 28 August 1945
 1st Air Commando Squadron: 8 July 1963 – 8 July 1965
 4th Bombardment Squadron: 15 January 1941 – 28 August 1945
 7th Bombardment Squadron: 15 January 1941 – 28 August 1945
 8th Bombardment Squadron: attached 5 August – 3 November 1964
 13th Bombardment Squadron: attached 5 August – 3 November 1964; 17 February – 16 May 1965
 18th Bombardment Squadron: 15 January 1941 – 28 August 1945
 19th Tactical Air Support Squadron: 8 July 1963 – 8 August 1964; 21 October 1964 – 8 July 1965
 602d Fighter Squadron (Commando): 18 October 1964 – 8 July 1965

Stations

 Langley Field, Virginia, 15 January 1941
 Westover Field, Massachusetts, 29 May 1941
 Pendleton Field, Oregon, 27 January 1942
 Davis-Monthan Field, Arizona, 13 May 1942
 Geiger Field, Washington, 4 July 1942
 Ephrata Army Air Base, Washington, 1 December 1942

 Bishop Army Air Field, California, 15 December 1942 – April 1944
 RAF Mendlesham (USAAF Station 156), England, 26 April 1944-c. 25 July 1945
 Sioux Falls Army Air Field, South Dakota, Aug-28 August 1945
 Bien Hoa Air Base, South Vietnam, 8 July 1963 – 8 July 1965
 United States Air Force Academy, Colorado, 31 October 1994 – present

Aircraft

 Boeing B-17C Flying Fortress (1941–1942)
 Boeing B-17D Flying Fortress (1941–1942)
 Boeing B-17G Flying Fortress (1944–1945)
 Douglas B-18 Bolo (1941)
 Consolidated B-24H Liberator (1942–1944)
 Consolidated B-24J Liberator (1942–1944)
 Douglas B-26 Invader (1963–1964)
 Martin B-57 Canberra (1964–1965)
 Cessna O-1 Bird Dog (1963–1965)
 Helio U-10 Courier (1963–1965)
 North American T-28 Trojan (1963–1964)
 Douglas C-47 Skytrain (1963–1965)
 Douglas AC-47 Spooky (1964–1965)
 Douglas A-1 Skyraider (1964–1965)
 Cessna T-41 Mescalero, (1994–2004)
 Cessna T-51, (1995–2004)
 de Havilland Canada UV-18 Twin Otter (1994–2004)

Awards and campaigns

See also

 Commandant of Cadets of the United States Air Force Academy
 B-17 Flying Fortress units of the United States Army Air Forces
 B-24 Liberator units of the United States Army Air Forces
 List of B-57 units of the United States Air Force
 List of Douglas A-1 Skyraider operators
 List of Douglas A-26 Invader operators
 List of Douglas C-47 Skytrain operators

References

Notes

Citations

Bibliography

 
 
 
 
 
 
 
 
  

 Further reading
 Freeman, Roger A. (1978) Airfields of the Eighth: Then and Now. After the Battle 
 Freeman, Roger A. (1991) The Mighty Eighth: The Colour Record. Cassell & Co.

External links

Military units and formations in Colorado
United States Air Force Academy
0034
American Theater of World War II